Szilas is the Hungarian name for:

Ulmoasa village, Tăuții-Măgherăuș town, Maramureș County, Romania
Brestovec, Komárno District, Slovakia